William Chesebrough (c.1594–1667) was a farmer and trader in the colonies of Massachusetts and Connecticut.  He was one of the four co-founders of Stonington, Connecticut, along with Thomas Stanton, Thomas Miner, and Walter Palmer.

Chesebrough came to America in 1630 in the party accompanying John Winthrop.  He was elected constable in Boston in 1634.  In 1640 he moved to Braintree, Massachusetts.  In 1649 he moved to the head of the Wequetequock Cove in present-day Stonington.

Chesebrough and his wife Anna are buried in Stonington at the Wequetequock Cemetery.

Notes

External links
Stonington Historical Society - In Search of the First Settlers
Original Stonington settlements c. 1651 - map

1590s births
1667 deaths
People from Stonington, Connecticut
English emigrants
Merchants from the Thirteen Colonies
People of colonial Connecticut